Alcyonidium hirsutum is a species of bryozoans found in shallow waters of low or fluctuating salinity, such as lagoons and estuaries. It is recognized by its surface with small papillae; when out of the water, it has a matt rather than shiny appearance.

See also
Dogger Bank itch

References

Ctenostomatida
Animals described in 1828